The 1960 United States presidential election in Louisiana took place on November 8, 1960, as part of the 1960 United States presidential election. State voters chose ten representatives, or electors, to the Electoral College, who voted for president and vice president.

Louisiana was won by Senator John F. Kennedy (D–Massachusetts), running with Senator Lyndon B. Johnson, with 50.42% of the popular vote against incumbent Vice President Richard Nixon (R–California), running with United States Ambassador to the United Nations Henry Cabot Lodge, Jr., with 28.59% of the popular vote.

Louisiana had a higher Roman Catholic population than the rest of Southern United States, greatly benefiting Kennedy, the second Roman Catholic to head a major party ticket and the first elected to the presidency. This Catholic base was concentrated in the southern half of the state, while Nixon and an unpledged States’ Rights slate split the northern Protestant parishes, with Nixon winning the less fertile poor white parishes and the unpledged slate the northern Black Belt. , this is the last election in which Jefferson Parish and St. Tammany Parish voted for a Democratic presidential candidate. There was also a failed effort in Louisiana to influence electors to vote for Nixon instead of Kennedy.

Results

Results by parish

See also
 United States presidential elections in Louisiana

Notes

References

Louisiana
1960
1960 Louisiana elections